Leggett House may refer to:

Leggett House (Little Red, Arkansas), listed on the NRHP in White County, Arkansas
Leggett House (Merced, California), listed on the NRHP in California
Thomas H. Leggett House, Merced, California, listed on the NRHP in Merced County, California
Andrews-Leggett House, Commerce, Michigan, listed on the NRHP in Oakland County, Michigan